Nirupama Devi (7 May 1883 – 7 January 1951) was a fiction writer from Berhampore in Murshidabad district. Her literary pseudonym was Srimati Devi.

Early life and education
Nirupama Devi's father was Nafar Chandra Bhatta who was a judicial employee. She was educated at home.

Critical reception
In 2013, Swapna Dutta writes for The Hindu that Nirupama Devi was an author who "wrote fearlessly about the social ills of the time: polygamy, forced marriages, dowry-related torture, and the heartbreak of widowhood or of being discarded by the husband for no fault of theirs," "wrote about society’s ruthless attitude to widows who dared to fall in love and, most of all, the utter helplessness of women in a male-dominated world," and "told the stories from a woman's perspective."

Works
Uchchhrinkhal was her first novel. Her other works include:
 Annapurnar Mandir (1913), a same name film was made by Naresh Mitra in 1954.
 Didi (1915)
 Aleya (1917)
 Bidhilipi (1919)
 Shyamali (1919)
 Bandhu (1921)
 Amar Diary (1927)
 Yugantarer Katha (1940)
 Anukarsa (1941)

Awards and honours
Nirupama Devi received the 'Bhubanmohini Gold Medal' in 1938 and 'Jagattarini Gold Medal' in 1943 from the University of Calcutta in recognition of her contribution to literature.

See also
 List of Indian writers

References

1883 births
1951 deaths
Indian women novelists
20th-century Indian novelists
Women writers from West Bengal
Novelists from West Bengal
People from Murshidabad district
20th-century Indian women writers